Ron Norsworthy is an American visual artist and designer. His work employs notions of spaces and decoration of space as narratives about his lived experience as a queer person of color as well as that of his community/communities. His interdisciplinary practice is a fusion of fine art, video and multiple design disciplines. In addition to his solo practice, Norsworthy is part of DARNstudio, an art collaboration with his husband and fellow artist, David Anthone.

Early life
Norsworthy was born in South Bend, Indiana. A graduate of Princeton University, he began his career working as a designer for the architect Michael Graves.

Career 
He was the CEO and founder of the multi-disciplinary design firm The Norsworthy Fund (2005-2010) as well as creator of N Home, a line of bedding and home accessories developed in partnership with television shopping channel QVC (UK), which he presented on the channel from 2011-2014.

His interest in the role of architecture in entertainment and pop culture led him to explore art direction and production design. He is responsible for numerous design projects, including many music videos, sets, interiors, and events.

Norsworthy was production designer for a music videos and televised performances for artists such as Britney Spears, Missy Elliott, Salt-N-Pepa, Erykah Badu, Madonna, Destiny's Child, Busta Rhymes, Aretha Franklin, Jay-Z, and Sean Combs (P. Diddy). These projects encompass a two decade span in which Norsworthy designed films, videos, and commercials, working with directors Matthew Rolston, Hype Williams and Spike Lee.  He was elected and served on the New York Chapter Board of Governors for the Grammy Awards  from 1999–2000.

Norsworthy's art has been exhibited in galleries and institutions.  His work was shown at the Studio Museum in Harlem as part of the exhibition "Harlemworld:  Metropolis as Metaphor" organized by curator Thelma Golden in 2004.  His piece, entitled "Reparation Tower, Harlem", was a full-scaled sales office for a luxury high-rise in the form of an upraised fist.  The installation and exhibition were favorably reviewed by architecture critic Herbert Mitchell Muschamp in The New York Times who described the work as "...  a symbol of defiance aimed at indifference.  But the symbol is handsomely fitted with interiors that signify bourgeois complacency...  the views from within must be fabulous."

Work

TV shows & specials
BET Spring Bling 2006 (Miami)
‘Making The Band', TV Show, MTV Networks
That's What I'm Talking About, TV Land Networks
“Spring Break” 2004 Miami, Florida, MTV Networks
“Madonna Live and On The Record”, MTV Networks
Summer Beach House Kick Off Party, MTV Networks
MTV Spring Break 2005 Cancun, MTV Networks
Like a Virgin/Hollywood Medley, 2003 MTV Music Video Awards, MTV Networks
“Direct Effect Presents: Fashionably Loud”, MTV Networks
TRL @ Your School, TV Special, MTV Networks
Toni Braxton "You're Makin' Me High", 1997 American Music Awards
National Christmas Tree Lighting Ceremony, 2009

Music videos
"Sinkin' In", Lisa Marie Presley, director: Barnabus
"Sexual (Li Da Di)", Amber, director: Ron Norsworthy
"Supernatural", Wild Orchid, director:  Ron Norsworthy
"(Shorty) Swing My Way", K.P. & Envyi, director:  Ron Norsworthy
"All I Need", Fat Joe, director: Gina Prince Bythewood
"Woo Hah!! Got You All in Check", Busta Rhymes, Director: Hype Williams
"Bag Lady", Erykah Badu, director: Erykah Badu
"Through the Rain", Mariah Carey, director: Joseph Kahn
"Put Your Hands Where My Eyes Can See", Busta Rhymes, director: Hype Williams
"Mo' Money Mo' Problems", Notorious B.I.G. f/ P. Diddy & Mase, director: Hype Williams
"I Believe I Can Fly", R Kelly, director: Hype Williams
"It's All About the Benjamins", P Diddy featuring Lil' Kim and The Lox, director: Paul Hunter
"The Rain (Supa Dupa Fly)", Missy Elliott, director: Hype Williams
"Loungin'", LL Cool J, director: Hype Williams
"A Rose is Still a Rose", Aretha Franklin, director: Lauryn Hill
"Phone Tap", The Firm, director: Nick Quested
"Take it to the Streets", Rampage, director: Darren Grant
"If I Ruled the World", Nas featuring Lauryn Hill, director: Hype Williams
"Killing Me Softly", The Fugees, director: Earle Sebastian
"1nce Again", A Tribe Called Quest, director: Hype Williams
"Jazzybelle", Outkast, director: Bille Woodruff
"I'll Be", Foxy Brown featuring Jay-Z, director: Brett Ratner
"I Don't Want To Lose You", Toni Braxton, director: Bille Woodruff
"That Girl", Maxi Priest featuring Shaggy, director: Hype Williams
"Let's Talk About Sex", Salt ‘n Pepa, director: Millicent Shelton
"The Weakness In Me", Melissa Etheridge, director: Maria Maggenti
"You Sang To Me", Marc Anthony, director: Jeff Richter

References

External links

Adolescent Angst Is on Location in Harlem

Telling Stories of Black Life Rescued Him

American production designers
Living people
People from South Bend, Indiana
Princeton University alumni
Year of birth missing (living people)